Steve Lungen (born circa 1946) is a former Republican District Attorney of Sullivan County, New York.

In February 2009, Lungen announced that he was retiring after 28 years as District Attorney.

In 1989, Lungen ran for re-election against now-Judge Frank Labuda. At that time, his office had the highest conviction rate and the lowest plea-bargain rate in upstate New York.

In 2003, Lungen co-founded the Sullivan County Drug Treatment Court, where people arrested for drug related offenses get treatment and probation instead of jail sentences.
In Sullivan County, defendants charged with a drug-selling offense were ineligible for drug court.  Two exceptions were made for 17-year-olds with drug addictions.

When announcing his retirement, Lungen did not foreclose working in the public arena, saying that he loves work and may seek a judgeship or enter private practice.  At the same time, he said he was endorsing then Assistant District Attorney, Jim Farrell, to take over his position.

Lungen was reputed to be an aggressive district attorney. Police officers would attempt to apprehend suspects over the Sullivan County border so that they be prosecuted by Lungen.

References

External links
Interview with and pictures of Lungen - The Catskill Chronicle

Sullivan County district attorneys
People from Sullivan County, New York
Living people
Year of birth uncertain
1940s births